Larrabee, also known as Larrabee & Ogden, was a station on the Chicago Transit Authority's North Side Main Line, which is now part of the Brown Line. The station was located at 1540 N. Larrabee Street in the Near North Side neighborhood of Chicago. Larrabee was situated east of Halsted, which closed at the same time as Larrabee, and north of Sedgwick.

Larrabee opened on June 6, 1900, and closed on August 1, 1949, along with 22 other stations as part of a CTA service revision.

References

Defunct Chicago "L" stations
Railway stations in the United States opened in 1900
Railway stations closed in 1949
1900 establishments in Illinois
1949 disestablishments in Illinois